TVB J2 is a Hong Kong Cantonese-language high-definition commercial free-to-air digital terrestrial television youth teenager channel owned byTelevision Broadcasts Limited a commercial television station that first opened broadcasting on 19 November 1967. Their new and free digital terrestrial television network in Hong Kong was officially launched on 30 June 2008.

To watch this channel a H.264/MPEG-4 AVC codec is required although viewers from Macau have free access if they are using the public cable television. It broadcasts 24 hours a day.

The programmes it broadcasts are mostly in Cantonese but occasionally there are programmes in other languages including Mandarin Chinese, Japanese and Korean. Most of the shows are broadcast on bilingual audio channels with Chinese subtitles.

The transmission of TVB J2 was upgraded from SDTV to HDTV video format on 2013-01-21 at 01:54 am.

Programmes

Korean and Japanese dramas are the most watched programmes on TVB J2. The time slots in prime time are specialized for most popular dramas every day, with ones from Korea (Mon-Fri), Taiwan (Mon-Fri, Sun), Japan (Fri-Sat) and USA (Sat-Sun).

Another popular genre of programmes for TVB J2 is Japanese anime.

Other programmes broadcast include:
Entertainment
Life Trends
Travel
Music

Originals
Love Academy
A space for teenagers and stars to discuss different kinds of love matters and play love games. The hosts are Miki Yeung and Cyrus Chow.

Summer In Beijing
A reality show that comprised three single girls and a gentleman, centered around the 2008 Summer Olympics in Beijing. The hosts are Ursule Wong, Joyce Wong, Grace Wong and Jason Chan.
According to the Year 2009 Market Promotion, TVB will produce new reality shows based on the format of this one.

Big Boys Club
All Things Girl

See also
Television Broadcasts Limited
TVB Jade
TVB Pearl
Digital Television in Hong Kong

External links

TVB channels
Chinese-language television stations
Television stations in Hong Kong
Television channels and stations established in 2008